Villa Alemana ("German Village" in English) is a city and commune in Chile's Zona Central. It was founded in 1896 by Italian and German immigrants. Villa Alemana is a part of the urban area known as Greater Valparaiso.

Villa Alemana's flag is notable for having the flag of the German Empire banded on it, along with the Flag of Germany.

History 

Villa Alemana was founded at the beginning of a Chilean railway development. Its climate is so temperate that the slogan is "The City of Eternal Youth" ("La ciudad de la eterna juventud" in Spanish) or "City of the Mills" ("Ciudad de los Molinos" in Spanish).

There was originally nothing but fields as well as a small vineyard,  trees and flowers, dominated by hawthorn trees (Crataegus). Where the Theater Pompeya stands today, land was offered for 20 cents per meter. And that was where Don Buenaventura Joglar had the idea to buy land and build a population which he named Villa Alemana, as German emigrants were the first to buy these sites.

On 8 November 1894, it was founded under the name of Viña Miraflores. The property was owned by Don Buenaventura Joglar, who divided the land into lots and set the name of Villa Alemana.

On 5 January 1918, the commune of Villa Alemana was established, but in 1928 it was incorporated in Quilpué. On 7 June 1933, Villa Alemana separated from Quilpué, recreating the commune of Villa Alemana. Today, it is a bedroom community for Viña del Mar and Valparaíso.

Demographics
Of these, 94,802 (99.1%) lived in urban areas and 821 (0.9%) in rural areas. The population grew by 33.4% (23,951 persons) between the 1992 and 2002 censuses.

Administration
As a commune, Villa Alemana is a third-level administrative division of Chile administered by a municipal council, headed by an alcalde who is directly elected every four years. The 2021-2024 alcalde is Javiera Toledo Muñoz. The council has the following members:

 Edith Alvear Guerra 
 Cecilia Quinteros Díaz
 Marcelo Valderrama Magna
 Guillermo Barra Arancibia
 Kesia Navarro Cueto
 Marcelo Góngora Carvajal
 María Fernanda Ternicier Andrades
 Alonso Fierro Reguera

Within the electoral divisions of Chile Villa Alemana is part of the 6th electoral district, represented in the Chamber of Deputies by the deputies:

 Andrés Longton Herrera (RN)
 Luis Pardo Sainz (RN)
 Camila Flores Oporto (RN)
 Pablo Kast Sommerhoff (EVOPOLI)
 Marcelo Schilling Rodríguez (PS)
 Carolina Marzán Pinto (PPD)
 Daniel Verdessi Belemmi (DC)
 Diego Ibáñez Cotroneo (CS)

As part of the 6th senatorial constituency (Valparaíso), the commune is represented in the Senate by the senators:

 Francisco Chahuán Chahuán (RN)
 Kenneth Pugh Olavarría (RN)
 Ricardo Lagos Weber (PPD)
 Isabel Allende Bussi (PS)
 Juan Ignacio Latorre Rivero (RD)

Twin cities
  Bethlehem, State of Palestine

References

External links

  Municipality of Villa Alemana

Populated places in Marga Marga Province
Communes of Chile
Populated places established in 1894